Vegard Bergstedt Lysvoll (born 16 August 1989) is a Norwegian footballer who plays as a striker. He played for Svolvær, Lofoten and Start before he joined Tromsdalen ahead of the 2009 season. After scoring 30 goals in the 2011 season, Lysvoll transferred to Tromsø. He spent the second half of the 2012 season on loan with his old club Tromsdalen, before he moved permanently to his old club in 2013.

Club career

Lysvoll was born in Bodø and grew up in Henningsvær. He moved to Svolvær at the age of 15 and started playing football for Svolvær IL, before he joined the 2. divisjon side Lofoten. Lysvoll scored two goals in his first match for the club, a pre-season friendly. He later moved to Start together with his twin brother Håvard Lysvoll at the age of 18. After half a year at Start, they moved back north and joined Tromsdalen ahead of the 2009 season. In 2011, he became top scorer in 2. divisjon with 30 goals when the team won promotion to the 1. divisjon. That season, Lysvoll also scored the team's record-breaking 100th goal; Tromsdalen finished with a total of 105, a new Norwegian record.

Lysvoll was wanted by Bodø/Glimt, but joined Tromsø together with his teammate from Tromsdalen, Ruben Kristiansen. He got his debut in 3–0 defeat against Rosenborg, and made a total of four appearances for Tromsø in the 2012 Tippeligaen. Lysvoll scored the last goal in the 4–0 victory against Tromsdalen in the Third round of the 2012 Norwegian Football Cup, and chose to not celebrate his goal against his old club.

In August 2012 he was loaned out to Tromsdalen to play more regularly. Lysvoll returned to Tromsø for the 2013 season, but did not play much for the first team. When he came on as a substitute against Strømsgodset on 29 June 2013 it was his first appearance that season, and the club told Lysvoll that he could transfer to another club during the summer transfer window if he wanted. After failing to become a regular member in Tromsø's first team, Lysvoll rejoined his former club Tromsdalen in August 2013.

Career statistics

Club

References

1989 births
Living people
People from Vågan
Sportspeople from Bodø
Norwegian footballers
Association football forwards
IK Start players
Tromsdalen UIL players
Tromsø IL players
Norwegian First Division players
Eliteserien players
Norwegian twins
Twin sportspeople